A Gathering of Eagles is a 1963 SuperScope Eastmancolor film about the U.S. Air Force during the Cold War and the pressures of command. The plot is patterned after the World War II film Twelve O'Clock High, which producer-screenwriter Sy Bartlett also wrote, with elements also mirroring Above and Beyond and Toward the Unknown, films written by his collaborator, Beirne Lay Jr.  The film was directed by Delbert Mann.

Rock Hudson plays a United States Air Force officer, Colonel Jim Caldwell, a Strategic Air Command (SAC) B-52 wing commander.  He must shape up his wing and men to pass a grueling operational readiness inspection (ORI) that the previous commander had failed and for which he had been relieved of his command. Caldwell is also recently married to an English wife, Victoria, and as a tough commanding officer doing whatever he has to do to shape up his command, his wife sees a side to him that she had not seen before.

The film also stars Rod Taylor, Mary Peach, Barry Sullivan, Kevin McCarthy, Henry Silva, Robert Lansing, Leif Erickson, and Richard Anderson.

Plot

The Inspector General of the Strategic Air Command (SAC), Major General "Happy Jack" Kirby (Kevin McCarthy), lands unannounced at an Air Force Base in California, home to an important Strategic Aerospace Wing, and announces there will be an Operational Readiness Inspection at no notice. His team discover many failings, and Kirby reports unfavourably to his superior, General Hewitt (Leif Erickson).

Hewitt decides that the wing commander must be replaced, and offers the prestigious job to his own aide, Colonel Jim Caldwell (Rock Hudson), who accepts gladly, especially as his vice-commander is to be an old and trusted friend Colonel Hollis Farr (Rod Taylor).

Caldwell immediately sees many reasons for the low standards of training and readiness, and institutes a number of harsh policies that bring him into conflict with Farr. Caldwell faces the unwelcome truth that Farr himself is too undisciplined, and gives him notice of dismissal. This causes a rift between Caldwell and his wife Victoria (Mary Peach) who thinks that her rumoured affair with Farr may have cost him his job.

At this point, Caldwell, absent on a hospital visit, is suddenly told of a genuine emergency on the base, as an unidentified aircraft is on final approach with no signal. Unable to return in time to handle the crisis, he orders Farr to assume command, and Farr brings it to a successful conclusion, but only by breaking a key regulation, which could easily cause them to fail their inspection. When Kirby demands an explanation, Caldwell defends Farr, stating that he would have made the same call. To their surprise, Kirby admits that he too would have done the same, and that the wing has passed its all-important test, and it seems clear that Farr will retain his job after all.

Cast

 Rock Hudson as Colonel James Caldwell, Commander, 904th Strategic Aerospace Wing (904th SAW)
 Rod Taylor as Colonel Hollis Farr, Vice Commander, 904th SAW
 Mary Peach as Victoria Caldwell, Caldwell's wife
 Barry Sullivan as Colonel William Fowler, Base Commander of Carmody Air Force Base
 Kevin McCarthy as Major General J. T. "Happy Jack" Kirby, SAC Inspector General
 Nelson Leigh as Brigadier General John Aymes, commander of the 904th SAW's parent Air Division
 Henry Silva as Colonel Joe "Smokin' Joe" Garcia, Deputy Commander for Maintenance, 904th SAW
 Leora Dana as Evelyn Fowler, Col Fowler's wife
 Robert Lansing as Senior Master Sergeant Banning, B-52 line chief
 Richard Le Pore as Staff Sergeant Kemler, boom operator on KC-135 tanker crew "Ramrod 67," who comes out of surgery in the base hospital asking how his crew did in the ORI.
 Ray Montgomery as Captain Linke, aircraft commander of B-52G bomber crew "Ranger 21"
 Richard Anderson as Colonel Ralph Josten, Deputy Commander for Operations, 904th SAW
 Leif Erickson as General Hewitt, Commander-in-Chief, Strategic Air Command (CINCSAC)
 Louise Fletcher as Mrs. Kemler, Sergeant Kemler's wife

Production
General Curtis LeMay, USAF (former head of the Strategic Air Command and serving at the time as Chief of Staff of the Air Force), used his considerable influence to allow Producer Sy Bartlett and Director Delbert Mann unprecedented access to various SAC facilities, in the belief that this film would play a vital role in reminding Americans that the Air Force did indeed have its weapons of mass destruction under tight control. Mann, a former World War II bomber pilot who had won an Academy Award for his first film (Marty), was eager to demonstrate that he could direct serious material and not merely light-hearted comedies which had not been nearly as well received.

Filming was done at Beale Air Force Base, California, using the facilities, Boeing B-52 Stratofortress, Boeing KC-135 Stratotanker and Lockheed T-33 aircraft, Martin Marietta Titan I missile sites, and personnel of the 456th Strategic Aerospace Wing.  The military housing used in several scenes is still used today as base housing at Beale AFB for senior commanders of the 9th Reconnaissance Wing.

It was originally announced that John Gavin would support Rock Hudson.

Tom Lehrer wrote one original song for this film, called "The SAC Song". Rod Taylor, as Hollis Farr, performs this song at a party for officers and their wives. Most of Lehrer's work is satirical, and the lyrics and music for this song are quite typical of Lehrer.

As Sy Bartlett and Delbert Mann were filming at SAC Headquarters at Offutt AFB in Omaha, they noticed that SAC personnel were unusually tense. They would later learn, when President John F. Kennedy would make this fact public, that SAC had recently learned of Nikita Khrushchev's plan to introduce nuclear-tipped  ballistic missiles into Cuba.

A subplot in the film where Colonel Farr has an affair with Colonel Caldwell's wife, played by Mary Peach, was removed during post production. The original choice for Mary Peach's role was Julie Andrews but according to screenwriter Robert Pirosh, Delbert Mann thought Andrews could not act, only sing.  Pirosh felt there was no rapport between Hudson and Peach.

Allusions to actual history
This film depicts the operations of a typical Strategic Aerospace Wing (nuclear bombers, aerial refueling aircraft, and ICBMs) of the Strategic Air Command during the early 1960s. The depiction of unannounced operational readiness inspections (ORI) accurately reflects events at SAC bases during this time period. When General Curtis LeMay became SAC commander in 1948, he undertook a number of base inspections, frequently flying unannounced to a SAC base. LeMay insisted on rigorous training and very high standards of performance for all SAC personnel, be they officers, enlisted men, aircrews, mechanics, or administrative staff, and reportedly commented, "I have neither the time nor the inclination to differentiate between the incompetent and the merely unfortunate." A poor showing during one of these inspections could, and often did, result in the immediate replacement of that base's wing commander, as well as on-site demotions for poorly performing airmen (or immediate on the spot promotions for officers and airmen who performed well).

A portrait of President John F. Kennedy hangs in Colonel Caldwell's office as part of a photographic depiction of the chain of command, providing an obvious time frame reference.

Col Daniel J. Bigelow, USAF was the pilot of the B-52G and acted as stand-in for Rock Hudson when Col Caldwell was depicted as flying the B-52G.

The number of the 904th, and the name of its base, Carmody, are both fictitious. The actual base used in filming, Beale AFB, is a two-hour drive from San Francisco. The picture is dedicated to the officers, airmen, and wives of the 456th Aerospace Wing of the Strategic Air Command.

The term "operational readiness inspection" (ORI) was actual terminology in the 1960s, 1970s, 1980s, and 1990s, and applied to exercises evaluating the combat readiness of SAC, TAC, USAFE, and PACAF units to carry out their nuclear mission. An ORI would involve the unannounced arrival of a KC-135 with approximately 70 personnel on board who would then conduct a week-long evaluation of every aspect of that base's and wing's readiness. One of the TCM Database commentators vouches specifically for the ORI as depicted, and also for the minimum interval takeoff (MITO) sequence (in which Colonels Caldwell and Farr witness B-52Gs taking off fifteen seconds apart on average). The filming of the MITO occurred in the autumn of 1962 at Blytheville Air Force Base, Arkansas, with aircraft of the 97th Bombardment Wing (H).

Reception
A Gathering of Eagles received relatively weak critical reviews and did poorly at the box office. After more than forty years, opinions vary widely as to the causes of the poor reception. The period in which this film was released is notable for the release, one or two years later, of a number of films that were decidedly unsympathetic to the US military (e.g., Dr. Strangelove, Fail-Safe, etc.). These films asserted a position regarding "positive control" of nuclear weapons that ran counter to A Gathering of Eagles and appeared to much greater critical acclaim and box-office reception.

Awards
A Gathering of Eagles received an Academy Award nomination for Best Sound Effects (Robert Bratton) in 1963.

See also
 List of American films of 1963
 Strategic Air Command (film)
 Bombers B-52

References

Notes

Bibliography

 Davis, Ronald L. "Robert Pirosh Interview." Words into Images: Screenwriters on the Studio System. Jackson, Mississippi: University Press of Mississippi, 2007. .
 Graham, Richard H. SR-71 Blackbird: Stories, Tales, and Legends. Minneapolis, Minnesota: Zenith Press, 2002, . 
 Vagg, Stephen. Rod Taylor: An Aussie in Hollywood. Albany, Georgia: Bear Manor Media,  2010. .

External links
 
 
 
 

1963 films
Cold War aviation films
Films directed by Delbert Mann
1963 romantic drama films
Films about the United States Air Force
Universal Pictures films
Films scored by Jerry Goldsmith
American romantic drama films
Films set in San Francisco
Films set in the San Francisco Bay Area
1960s English-language films
1960s American films
Films shot in Arkansas
Mississippi County, Arkansas